Vat Group AG (proper spelling VAT Vakuumventile AG) is an internationally active Swiss company for vacuum valves and related services in the semiconductor, display and solar sectors, as well as in the industrial and research sectors, with headquarters in Haag in the municipality of Sennwald in the Canton of St. Gallen (Switzerland). The internationally active company's products are used in semiconductor and flat panel display manufacturing, glass and tool coating, Metallurgy, surface analysis, high-energy physics, Synchrotrons, Laser technology, and space simulation, among others.

VAT generated net sales of CHF 692.4 million in 2020 and employs about 2,000 people worldwide, including more than 700 in Switzerland. Around a quarter of its staff work in research and development. VAT comprises the three business areas Valves (550.4 million net sales 2020), Global Services (127.3 million net sales 2020) and industry (14.8 million net sales 2020).

The Valves business segment is divided into individual valves (67% of 2015 net sales) and modules (6% of 2015 net sales). The industry business segment consists of the two subsidiaries COMVAT (diaphragm bellows) and Sysmec (manufacturer of mechanical components and assemblies). In 2015, VAT had a 41% share of the global vacuum valve market, according to VLSIresearch.
The company operates manufacturing sites in Haag (Switzerland), Penang (Malaysia) and Arad (Romania). Exports account for 99%, with Asia at 40% and the U.S. at 37% representing the most important markets, followed by Europe at 23%.

History 
Siegfried Schertler founded the company in 1965 in Flawil, St. Gallen, Switzerland. The initial focus was on research. Later, the company headquarters moved to Haag in the municipality of Sennwald in the Alpine Rhine, Switzerland. In 1988, the company entered the field of Semiconductor device fabrication. After the turn of the millennium, the company expanded into the market areas of flat panel displays and photovoltaics. In February 2014, Capvis and Partners Group jointly acquired the VAT Group. VAT has been listed on the SIX Swiss Exchange since 14 April 2016.

References

External links 
 Official website

Publicly traded companies
Manufacturing companies of Switzerland
1965 establishments in Switzerland